Podocarpus parlatorei is a species of tree in the family Podocarpaceae and native to Argentina and Bolivia, where it grows on steep hillsides on the eastern flanks of the Andes. It has been harvested commercially in the past but is now protected under CITES. The International Union for Conservation of Nature has assessed its status as being "near threatened".

Description
Podocarpus parlatorei is an evergreen shrub or tree that grows up to 15 (occasionally 30) meters high. The trunk is straight and cylindrical and branches often grow from close to the ground.

Distribution and habitat
Podocarpus parlatorei is endemic to the eastern flanks of the Andes in northwestern Bolivia and Argentina. The population is fragmented into a number of subpopulations by the lowland forests and dry river valleys that dissect the steep-sided foothills.

Ecology
In the south of its range, this species forms pure stands, but further north it tends to grow under a canopy formed by Alnus acuminata, Cedrela angustifolia, and Juglans australis. The flowers are wind pollinated and the seed is dispersed by birds and mammals that eat the fleshy fruits. These include guans (Penelope spp.), band-tailed pigeons (Patagioenas fasciata), and the hog-nosed skunk (Conepatus chinga). The gray grass mouse (Abrothrix illuteus) lives on steep hillsides amongst the Podocarpus parlatorei and Alnus acuminata trees.

Uses
The timber is lightweight, soft and easy to work. It has been used commercially for making pencils and for building construction, flooring, furniture making, veneers, posts and utensils. Its international commercial trade has now been banned by its listing in Appendix I of CITES because excessive logging was depleting populations, but it is still harvested for local use. It is also used in field boundaries and around houses as hedges.

Status
In the past, this tree was listed by the International Union for Conservation of Nature as being "data deficient", however more recent research has enabled the IUCN to evaluate its status. The population is naturally fragmented because of geographical features and although in the past much logging has reduced populations, the remaining populations are more secure, being in remote areas or on steep hillsides where access is difficult. Though vulnerable to man-made disturbances such as logging and fires, it is a pioneer species and able to regenerate in grassland or at forest fringes. For these reasons, the IUCN has assessed its population size as stable and its conservation status as near threatened. As a cold-tolerant, subtropical montane conifer with a fragmented population, this species might be expected to be affected by global warming. However research suggests that it is able to shift its range to higher altitudes during warmer periods and will cope with climate change as it has in the past during climatic fluctuations.

References

parlatorei
Trees of Argentina
Trees of Bolivia
Taxonomy articles created by Polbot
Plants described in 1866
Flora of the Southern Andean Yungas